"I Should Be with You" is a song written and recorded by American country music artist Steve Wariner.  It was released in June 1988 as the second single and title track from the album I Should Be with You.  The song reached #2 on the Billboard Hot Country Singles chart.

Charts

Weekly charts

Year-end charts

References

1988 singles
1988 songs
Steve Wariner songs
Songs written by Steve Wariner
Song recordings produced by Jimmy Bowen
Music videos directed by Michael Salomon
MCA Records singles